Attorney General Hobart may refer to:

Sir Henry Hobart, 1st Baronet (1560s–1625), Attorney General for England and Wales
James Hobart (born 1436), Attorney General for England and Wales